Phrynobatrachus giorgii is a species of frog in the family Phrynobatrachidae. It is endemic to western or northern Democratic Republic of the Congo and is only known from its type locality, Yambata, possibly in the Province of Équateur. The specific name giorgii honours Stephano Oronzo Vicenzo de Giorgi who collected near Yambata River just before the First World War. Common names Yambata river frog and Giorgi's puddle frog have been proposed for this species.

There is little specific information on ecology of this species, and even its distribution is unclear.

References

giorgii
Frogs of Africa
Amphibians of the Democratic Republic of the Congo
Endemic fauna of the Democratic Republic of the Congo
Taxa named by Gaston-François de Witte
Amphibians described in 1921
Taxonomy articles created by Polbot